Clay Perry (born October 20, 1990) is an American Hip-Hop songwriter and recording artist from Ft. Worth, Texas. Perry was nominated for Best R&B & Hip-Hop Artist in 2019 by Fort Worth Weekly.  Perry released his debut long play project, IKIKN, on July 13, 2018.

Early life 
Clay Perry was born October 20, 1990. Born of two youth ministers, Perry was raised in a Christian home that will go on to inspire themes within his writings. Perry served in the United States Navy from September 2009 to October 2011 when he was honorably discharged.

Career 
In 2016, Perry collaborated with also Ft. Worth based recording artist, Thyra, as well as 8ball of 8ball & MJG on 'High', a song featured on The Best Of Texas Volume 4 released by Houston Texas DJ Michael "5000" Watts of Swishahouse affiliation. In 2018 Glasses Malone made an appearance on Perry's debut album, IKIKN. His singles 'I Can't Help Ya' and 'Roll N' Ride' experienced substantial success which Perry attributes to social media. Production from Houston, Texas area producer Mr. Lee is featured on Perry's third release, Exodus.

Artistry

Influences 
Clay Perry's musical inspirations are Snoop Dogg, The D.O.C. and  N.W.A.'s Dr. Dre. Perry's extra-musical influences include his religious upbringing and the Bible of which he frequently refers to in his writing.

Controversy 
After a week of its September 27, 2019, release, Clay Perry's originally scheduled sophomore album Lyin' King, was pulled from major digital service platforms as the result of a dispute between Perry and the album's producer. The disagreement between the two garnered attention from the Dallas Observer which documented the feud that took place on Facebook.

Discography

Studio albums

Singles

As featured artist

Guest appearances

References

1990 births
Living people
21st-century American singers
Musicians from Dallas
American male rappers
Southern hip hop musicians
United States Navy sailors
21st-century American rappers
People from Fort Worth, Texas
21st-century American male singers